Slave Pit Inc. is the artist collective, production company and independent record label created for releasing projects by the heavy metal band Gwar and related side projects such as Mensrea and Locus Factor.

History (1984–1993)

1984
Hunter Jackson rents a studio in an old Richmond Dairy building, intending to shoot a space pirate movie entitled "Scumdogs of the Universe". He names his studio "The Slave Pit".
1985
Two costumes are completed and Death Piggy moves to the Dairy building.
Mike Delaney moves into the Dairy building and names his studio "The Swamp".
Chuck Varga moves to Richmond and moves in with Delaney.
1986
Don Drakulich rents studio space in the Dairy building and ultimately moves in.
Many new artists and bands move into the Dairy building.
Slave Pit, The Swamp, and Don's studio begin prop production for Gwar performances.
1987
Renovations to the Dairy building force many tenants out and prop production moves to a tobacco warehouse a few miles away.
Slave Pit is soon kicked out of the tobacco warehouse and returns to Don's cramped Dairy space.
The artists solidify from a loose collaboration to real members of Gwar; consisting of Don Drakulich, Chuck Varga, Mike Bonner, Scott Krahl, Dave Musel, and Dave Brockie.
In October, 801 W. Broad St. is rented as a new Slave Pit.
1988
In October, the first complete North American tour coast to coast.
1989
The North American tour aptly named Death Tour 89 begins.
1990
Slave Pit Incorporated becomes a legal corporation.
In April, Scumdogs of the Universe is recorded, and released in July.
In September, North American Tour De Scum 90.
1991
In September, Slave Pit Inc. moves to 2010 Chamberlayne Ave.
In October Phallus in Wonderland filmed.
1992
In February, Phallus in Wonderland released.
1993
First Gwar-B-Que at the Slave Pit.

Artist roster 
 Gwar
 Death Piggy
 Mensrea
 Locus Factor
 X-Cops
 Dave Brockie Experience

See also 
 DRT Entertainment
 Shimmy Disc
 Metal Blade Records
 List of record labels

References 
Slave Pit Inc Timeline Retrieved on August 14, 2008.

External links 
 Official site
 Official Gwar site

American independent record labels
Rock record labels
Vanity record labels
Companies based in Richmond, Virginia